The Division of Moore is an Australian electoral division in the state of Western Australia.

History

The Division was named after George Fletcher Moore, the first Advocate-General of Western Australia, and is at present a safe Liberal seat held by Ian Goodenough since the 2013 federal election, having changed significantly throughout its history in both geographical area and in political character.

Due to significant demographic change, the seat's boundaries and constituency has evolved considerably since it was proclaimed at the 11 May 1949 redistribution. At that time, it was basically a rural electorate, which included parts of the Wheatbelt along the Indian Ocean coast to the north and east of Perth, the state capital — a similar region to that presently covered by the state seat of Moore. At the 1949 election, it was won by the Country Party. The seat maintained its rural character over the years. However, growth in Perth's northern suburbs of Perth from the 1960s onwards eventually pushed its southern boundary inside the urban fringe.

The 28 February 1980 redistribution moved much of the electorate's rural hinterland into the new seat of O'Connor, and the creation of Cowan four years later, in the suburbs north of Reid Highway to Whitfords Avenue, transformed Moore into a safe Labor seat, with a population centred on Midland, but still including the shires of Chittering, Gingin and Dandaragan to the north.

The creation of Pearce at the 31 March 1989 redistribution pushed Moore into the now heavily urban and relatively affluent coastal areas north of the Reid Highway, removing areas like Midland and Beechboro completely, and making it a notionally Liberal seat. The Liberals won it at the 1990 election and have held it ever since, apart from the period between the 1996 and 1998 federal elections, when sitting member Paul Filing was disendorsed by the Liberal Party and was elected as an Independent. The Liberal candidate, Mal Washer, regained the seat for his party at the 1998 election.

Geography
Since 1984, federal electoral division boundaries in Australia have been determined at redistributions by a redistribution committee appointed by the Australian Electoral Commission. Redistributions occur for the boundaries of divisions in a particular state, and they occur every seven years, or sooner if a state's representation entitlement changes or when divisions of a state are malapportioned.

In August 2021, the Australian Electoral Commission (AEC) announced that Moore would gain the suburbs of Carine, North Beach and Watermans Bay, along with parts of Gwelup, Karrinyup and Trigg, from the abolished seat of Stirling, along with the remainder of Kingsley from the seat of Cowan. These boundary changes took place at the 2022 election.

The seat presently contains the vast majority of the City of Joondalup, in the northwest metropolitan area of Perth. Suburbs presently included are:

 Beldon 
 Burns Beach
 Carine 
 Connolly 
 Craigie 
 Currambine 
 Duncraig 
 Edgewater 
 Heathridge 
 Hillarys 
 Gwelup (part)
 Iluka 
 Joondalup 
 Kallaroo 
 Karrinyup (part)
 Kingsley
 Kinross 
 Marmion 
 Mullaloo
 North Beach 
 Ocean Reef 
 Padbury 
 Sorrento 
 Trigg (part)
 Watermans Bay
 Woodvale

Members

Election results

References

External links
 Division of Moore - Australian Electoral Commission

Electoral divisions of Australia
Constituencies established in 1949
1949 establishments in Australia
Federal politics in Western Australia